"Talk of the devil" is an idiom synonymous to "Speak of the devil". 

Talk of the devil may also refer to:

Talk of the Devil, a 1936 British crime film
Speak of the Devil (Ozzy Osbourne album), released as Talk of the Devil in England
Talk of the Devil, an album by Master
"Talk of the Devil", a 1984 song by Larry Wallistitle on Previously Unreleased 
Rozmowy z diabłem, a 1965 book by Leszek Kołakowski, released a Talk of the Devil in the UK

See also
Speak of the Devil (disambiguation)